Stéphane Hennebert (born 2 June 1969) is a Belgian former road cyclist. Professional from 1992 to 2000, he most notably won the Grand Prix La Marseillaise in 1995 and the Grote Prijs Jef Scherens in 1997.

Major results

1990
 3rd Omloop Het Nieuwsblad U23
1991
 1st Omloop Het Nieuwsblad U23
 2nd Vlaamse Havenpijl
 2nd Ronde van Vlaanderen U23
1992
 2nd GP de Fourmies
 2nd Grand Prix d'Isbergues
 6th Circuit des Frontières
 10th Overall Tour of Ireland
 10th Paris–Camembert
1993
 8th Grand Prix d'Isbergues
 8th Grote Prijs Jef Scherens
 9th GP du canton d'Argovie
1994
 2nd Ronde van Limburg
 7th Overall Tour d'Armorique
 7th GP de la Ville de Rennes
1995
 1st Grand Prix La Marseillaise
 7th A Travers le Morbihan
1996
 2nd Le Samyn
 2nd Grand Prix de la Ville de Lillers
 7th Kampioenschap van Vlaanderen
 8th Grand Prix Cerami
1997
 1st Grote Prijs Jef Scherens
1998
 4th De Kustpijl

References

External links
 

1969 births
Living people
Belgian male cyclists
People from Lobbes
Cyclists from Hainaut (province)